Tommy Woolfolk, better known by his stage name Luckyiam, is a rapper from Los Angeles, California. He is a founding member of Living Legends. He is also a member of CMA and Mystik Journeymen.

History
Luckyiam released Most Likely to Succeed in 2007.

In 2009, he released a collaborative album, One Uppers, with Sapient of Debaser as The Prime.

I Love Haters was released as a free download on Lifted Research Group's website in 2011. The album features guest appearances from Aceyalone and Slug.

He released Time to Get Lucky in 2012. He formed the duo Luck & Lana with vocalist Lana Shea. Luck & Lana have since released 2 albums together with production team Kill the Computer, under the name Luck & Lana Kill the Computer. Their first self-titled album was released in 2013. The follow up, titled Go, was released in 2016 and has been critically acclaimed for both its lyricism and genre-bending beats.

Discography

Albums
 Walkman Invaders (1995) 
 4001: The Stolen Legacy (1995) 
 Children ov tha Night (1996) 
 Pressed 4 Time (1996) 
 Worldwide Underground (1998) 
 The Black Sands ov Eternia (1999) 
 Overall (1999) 
 Justify the Means (2002)
 Magic (2002) 
 Extra Credit (2002)
 Extra Credit 2 (2003)
 All Over (2005) 
 Most Likely to Succeed (2007)
 The Present (2009)
 One Uppers (2009) 
 Return 2 the Love (2010) 
 I Love Haters (2011)
 Time to Get Lucky (2012)
 Luck & Lana Kill the Computer (2013) 
 Go (2016)

EPs
 Break That Fear (1998) 
 Mercury Rising (1999) 
 Malapas Tears (2002) 
 The Collectors Item (2003)

Singles
 "Escape Forever" (1996) 
 "The Best" (1999) 
 "Windows" b/w "Tactics" (2004) 
 "If I Do" b/w "Please Be Quiet (Shut Up!)" (2002)
 "Shut Up" b/w "Come Along" (2002)
 "Are We There Yet?" b/w "Good Side" (2004) 
 "Canustaycool?" b/w "Jane Is a Groupie" (2005) 
 "The Best I Can" b/w "Borrowed Time" (2008)

Guest appearances
 Murmurecordings - "Strike a Pose" from Poor Local Poetry (1998)
 Eligh - "Mingus and Me" and "A Gas Dreamers Farewell" from Gas Dream (2000)
 Omid - "Live from Tokyo" from Monolith (2003)
 Scarub - "Make Things Crack" from A New Perspective (2004)
 Subtitle - "Crew Cut (for Sale)" from Young Dangerous Heart (2005)
 Eligh - "Love ov My Life" from Grey Crow (2010)
 Grieves - "Identity Cards" from 88 Keys and Counting (2010)
 Isaiah Toothtaker - "Unheard Unseen" from Illuminati Thug Mafia (2011)
 Lush One - "Stella Artois" from Gold Bricks in the Wall (2011)
 Sole - "D.O.I. (Death of Industry)" from Nuclear Winter Volume 2: Death Panel (2011)
 Abstract Rude - "Kan of Whoop Ass Reprise" from Keep the Feel: A Legacy of Hip Hop Soul (2015)
 DJ Free Leonard - "Power To The People" from "Assimilate Or Eliminate" (2015) 
 DJ Free Leonard - "Hip Hop Ain't The Same" from "Assimilate Or Eliminate" (2015) 
 Broken Treaty Poet - "Take AIM" from "Birthright Tribal Member Soundtrack" (2017) 
 DJ Free Leonard - "Wise Words Spoken" from "T.H.E.Y. EP''" (2018)

See also
 Living Legends
 Sunspot Jonz

References

External links
 
 
 

African-American male rappers
Alternative hip hop musicians
Living people
Rappers from Los Angeles
21st-century American rappers
21st-century American male musicians
21st-century African-American musicians
1973 births